Paramus Park is a shopping mall located in Paramus, New Jersey, United States.

Description 

It is accessible from the northbound Garden State Parkway at exit 163 and at exit 165 in both directions. An entrance to the southbound lanes is located in the mall's rear parking lot. Access off of NJ 17 is available on two access roads. The Sears Drive entrance is only available from the northbound lanes but southbound drivers are able to access A&S Drive via an exit and an overpass constructed specifically for the mall.

At  and with about 100 stores, Paramus Park, compared to the larger Garden State Plaza (which is three times its size), is a more regional, destination-oriented mall, with a higher-than-average sales per square foot, estimated by industry experts to be between $400 and $500 a square foot or more. In addition to attracting upscale shoppers and tenants, its smaller stores, lower congestion and location along the Garden State Parkway in an affluent area attracted shoppers responding to the Great Recession of 2007-2009, according to a 2011 NorthJersey.com report. By 2016, estimates were that the mall had tenants for 97 percent of the stores and was bringing in $430 in sales per square foot.

The four major malls in the borough -- Garden State Plaza (opened in 1957), Bergen Town Center (also 1957), Fashion Center (opened in 1967) and Paramus Park  -- account for a major portion of the $6 billion in annual retail sales generated in Paramus, more than any other ZIP Code in the United States. Paramus Park gets 6 million visitors annually to its 107 stores. Located in Bergen County, the mall is subject both to the state Blue laws that apply to the entire county by referendum and the borough's stricter ordinance, which require them to be closed on Sundays.

History 
Paramus Park was initially one of three enclosed malls in Paramus at the time of its construction. The Fashion Center, which is located near Paramus Park along Route 17, was the first built specifically as a strictly-indoor facility and opened in 1967. The Bergen Mall, located on Route 4 and built in 1957, became the second when the former outdoor mall was enclosed in 1973. (At the time Garden State Plaza, built in 1957, was still an outdoor mall; it completed its conversion to an enclosed mall in 1984.) Paramus Park remains one of three indoor malls in Paramus; the Fashion Center and The Shoppes on IV, the latter constructed after Paramus Park was built, were converted into outdoor shopping plazas.

The genesis of the mall dates back to efforts by A&S in mid-1966 to identify a site for a location in Bergen County. From 1969 to 1971, Federated Department Stores and The Rouse Company, which had been selected to develop the mall, acquired land for the mall itself, as well as to create a bridge connecting the site to Route 17.

The mall opened on March 14, 1974, with a  Abraham & Straus (since turned into a Macy's store) and Sears (which did not open until August) as anchors and space for 120 specialty stores. The Paramus High School Marching Band played at the grand opening. The mall's second-floor food court was an innovation, and is now credited as the first successful shopping mall food court. A Fortunoff opened at the store in 1977.

The mall is shaped as a four-legged zigzag, with an anchor store at each end and the mezzanine-level food court encircling an atrium which featured  of water flowing each minute over a  terraced waterfall surrounded by vegetation and punctuated by a pair of escalators; claimed to be the nation's second largest, tens of thousands of coins were tossed into the artificial waterfall, with nearly $3,500 collected in the mall's first year. In its first 25 years, some 12 million coins had been collected from the waterfall, with an average of $400 per month donated from the proceeds to charitable organizations in the area. 

A stairway and a glass elevator surrounded by terraced gardens rounded out the access points to the second level food court until 1999 when it was demolished due to long lines, and replaced by two new elevators which were relocated. The food court has been very popular at the lunch hour with the area office workers. The garden-like design was prevalent throughout the rest of the mall. Trees lined the main promenade of the mall, along with park benches; all under large skylights. Two small courtyards were at the other leg intersections; one hosted a carousel and the other a lowered seating area with a bronze statue of a turkey, standing  in height. The turkey statue was inspired by the name of the town from which the mall gets its name. Paramus comes from the Lenni Lenape Native American word meaning "land of the wild turkey" or "place of fertile soil". The last carousel was installed during the 1990s. The carousel was installed by Peter and Tony Bowen of Bowen Accountants in 1976, when at the time the play area was considered dangerous and was the site of a number of child injuries. The carousel was removed in August 2013 so that the mall could use that space for other purposes. 

Paramus Park is mentioned in the lyrics of the 1977 Dean Friedman song "Ariel". The two characters in the song were "standing by the waterfall at Paramus Park".

In 1986, Paramus Park was the site of an innovative McDonald's restaurant in its food court, which featured a décor with oak trim, pastel tiles and marble counters, in lieu of the traditional plastic interior in primary colors. The facility cost $650,000 to construct, 40% more than a typical McDonald's, and was designed to create more of the feel of an upscale restaurant. Closed in 2000, it was replaced by a walk-up. The McDonald's location closed in the 2010s and was replaced by a Burger King. Restrooms are now located in its former location. A Claire's store was opened in 1988, and closed in 2006.

Hanson's 1997 video "Tulsa, Tokyo & the Middle of Nowhere", features the band traveling to Paramus Park on May 7, 1997, performing in the food court in front of over 6,000 screaming fans; the performance had been promoted by radio station WHTZ, which had anticipated a crowd numbering in the hundreds, not the thousands who showed up. The performance was Hanson's first public appearance after the release of "MMMBop".

In 2004, General Growth Properties acquired Rouse Co., which owned Paramus Park, as well as other malls in the state, including Willowbrook Mall in Wayne and Woodbridge Center in Woodbridge Township.

During the Great Recession of 2007-2009, the mall's smaller stores, historical lower congestion and location along the Garden State Parkway in an affluent area attracted upscale shoppers and tenants that had previously shifted away from smaller malls in lieu of the larger ones in the area, such as Westfield Garden State Plaza, according to a 2011 NorthJersey.com report.

The mall received approval in 2008 for a new  lifestyle center on the west side of the mall, which would have more of a "main street" feel for shoppers.

In 2011 the Foot Locker complex store was closed as L.L. Bean decided to begin leasing the space. The store opened in November 2011.

This would have been a Regal Cinemas movie theater. 

In October 2017, it was reported that the Sears department store that had served as an anchor store since the mall opened in 1974 would be replaced by a Stew Leonard's supermarket on the first floor and a 12-screen Regal Cinemas theater on the second floor. On December 7, mall representatives appeared at a public hearing to request approval by zoning officials to convert the aging Sears department store into a Stew Leonard's supermarket and movie theater. By 2019, NJ.com, the completed 80,000 square foot supermarket, the first one built by Stew Leonard's in New Jersey, had "transformed Paramus Park Mall into a different kind of destination"  by providing a new option for grocery shoppers.

In 2018, Uniqlo announced that it would open at the mall after moving from Garden State Plaza.

References

External links 

Paramus Park, International Council of Shopping Centers

Paramus, New Jersey
Brookfield Properties
Shopping malls in New Jersey
Shopping malls established in 1974
Buildings and structures in Bergen County, New Jersey
Tourist attractions in Bergen County, New Jersey
Shopping malls in the New York metropolitan area
1974 establishments in New Jersey